Television in Bosnia and Herzegovina was first introduced in 1961.
Out of 94 TV stations, 71 are commercial, 20 are public (regional, local or municipal ownership), while 3 public services are funded through subscription.

History 
First broadcasting in Bosnia and Herzegovina started in 1961 when Radio-Televizija Sarajevo began its programme although without its own TV studio at that time (it used Radio Sarajevo's premises for this purpose).

Televizija Sarajevo (TVSA) started broadcasting its own TV program on 17 March 1969. with first live TV-news program called "Večernji ekran“ (Evening Screen). At the beginning of 1975., the first phase of the construction of RTV Dom – TV headquarters building in Sarajevo was completed. Two years later, in 1977, the second television program (TVSA 2) was launched.

With the help of other members of the Yugoslav Radio Television system, Radio-Television Sarajevo successfully implemented all special broadcasting programs dedicated to the 1984 Winter Olympics in Sarajevo. The third television channel (TVSA 3) has started with broadcasting in 1989 from headquarters also known as the RTV Dom (nickname "Sivi dom") located in Sarajevo.

During the breakup of Yugoslavia in the early 1990s, Yugoslav Radio Television system dissolved when most republics became independent countries. The once-recognizable joint program created by the exchange of TV content in JRT network soon was suspended and interrupted, and separate national TV stations began to use propaganda in tv news and other programs. As a result, the once subnational broadcasting centers became public broadcasters of the newly independent states. In such conditions, the first commercial television stations in the Balkans appear.

At the beginning of the War in Bosnia, in 1992, RTV Sarajevo changed its name to Radio and Television of Bosnia and Herzegovina (RTV BiH). Headquarters of the RTV BiH were often exposed to war damages. During the siege of Sarajevo, RTV BiH was forced to broadcast only one radio (Radio BiH) and one television program (tv bih) via damaged transmitters at Hum TV Tower, with minimal technical conditions.

On 2 May 1992, Hum Tower was partly destroyed by the JNA and VRS. Militants illegally took over all property (TV transmitters and releys) from the former TVSA. Seven out of ten TV repeaters from former TVSA in the territory of BiH were controlled by the JNA and VRS.

From stolen equipment, a parallel new TV channel (Kanal S – SRT; now: RTRS) was established in May 1992 to broadcast propaganda or news builtens from Serbian RTV Beograd via its seat in Pale, near Sarajevo. The second TV transmitter above the Sarajevo, Bosnian capital, (Trebević Television transmitter) was directly controlled by SRT (Srpska radio televizija). With the outbreak of the Conflict between Croatia and Bosnian and Herzegovina, TV transmitters under the control of HVO started to rebroadcast news programs of HRT via its Erotel affiliate based in Mostar.

During the war (1992–1995), many independent local or regional stations (public and commercial) were launched across the country. Former network affiliates of the second radio channel (Radio Sarajevo 2) often were used as facilities for these new TV stations.

On 1 January 1993, RTV BiH was admitted as an active member of the European Broadcasting Union.

In the Alipašino Polje neighborhood of Sarajevo, on 28 June 1995, a modified air-bomb was thrown by JNA/VRS into the building of RTV BiH. One person was killed, and at least 30 injured.

Hum Tower also suffered major damage, which is partially repaired after the war by technicians from national public broadcaster, BHRT.

After the war, many local media continued to work. With the help of various international donors, equipment has been renewed through media support projects.

On 2 March 2001, Communications Regulatory Agency of Bosnia and Herzegovina was founded with mission to regulate the electronic communications and audiovisual sector in BiH. An important task was the management and supervision of the frequency spectrum.

After 17 July 2002, in Bosnia and Herzegovina there was no radio and TV stations that broadcast without official broadcasting licence issued by the CRA.

All local media in BiH, which could not meet the official criteria of the competition for broadcasting licences were closed in the period between 2000 and 2002. According to the recommendations, CRA BiH has established a public register of permits issued for all broadcasters with relevant data about all media outlets (radio stations, TV channels...) who have received permission to work.

Analogue television

Free-to-air terrestrial broadcasters

National and near-national coverage

Television licence funding 
Bosnia and Herzegovina has 3 public broadcasters financed from radio and television fees (RTV pretplata/pristojba). The amount of television fees in BiH is 7.5 BAM per month (collected along with Electric bill).

The national public broadcaster for Bosnia and Herzegovina is BHRT (Radio televizija Bosne i Hercegovine). With one television and one radio channel it covers more than 97% of the country. BHRT is the only Bosnian member of the European Broadcasting Union.

The entity broadcaster for Federation of Bosnia and Herzegovina is RTVFBiH (Radio televizija Federacije Bosne i Hercegovine). The program is broadcast on one radio and one television channel.
The entity broadcaster for Republika Srpska is RTRS (Radio televizija Republike Srpske). The program is broadcast via one radio and two television channels (one channel is via cable systems).

There are plans to establish a public TV corporation that would operate, consolidate and improve quality of all Bosnian tax-funded public broadcasters.

Commercial funding 
Near-national commercial broadcasters are primarily focused on the entitiy markets, but some of them also broadcast a joint program (Mreža TV). They provide a common advertising space (on country, entity, or regional level) that is more attractive to major advertisers.

Regional coverage

Public funding 
Other public TV stations broadcast only locally at the municipal, local, and regional levels, such as 5 cantonal TV stations (e.g. TVSA, RTV TK, RTV USK, RTV ZE, and RTV BPK).

Commercial funding 
Commercial terrestrial stations are mostly located in larger towns and settlements (Sarajevo, Banja Luka, Mostar, Bijeljina, Brčko, Bihać, Trebinje, Travnik, Zenica...).

Local, city or municipal coverage 
Local TV networks share local news (e.g. BH Veza in FBiH entity or PRIMA Mreža in RS entity).

Public funding

Commercial funding

Cable and IPTV television 
There are 36 licensed cable TV operators in Bosnia and Herzegovina.

Depending on cable provider and subscription type, cable TV offer usually includes most of the local terrestrial channels. Offers are usually customized for specific city. Basic cable offer is limited to 40-65 TV channels in the starting packages. Digital and IPTV packages are limited to 100-350 channels (including the additional channel packages, HD packages, VOD etc.).

Registered on-demand audiovisual media service providers by CRA BiH: 
 Videoteka by Super TV
 MojaTV Videoteka & MojaTV Flix by BH Telecom
 HOME.TV Videoteka by HT Eronet
 DEPO TV / ZONA by www.depo.ba/depo-tv
 BUKA TV by www.6yka.com
 PRVI.TV by www.prvi.tv
 video klub by Telemach
 video klub HKB-net by HKB-net
 video klub HS by HS kablovska
 RTV BIR by www.bir.ba
 Hayat PLAY by Hayat TV
 RTV BN d.o.o. Bijeljina by RTV BN
 JP RTRS Banja Luka by RTRS

Domestic pay-tv channels 
There are over 66 licensed TV stations (both private and publicly owned) which broadcast their programmes exclusively via cable, satellite or IPTV. Cable and IPTV operators also manage their own TV channels that are part of their multimedia services (digital or IPTV info channels).

Public funding (Cable only) 

Many local and regional public TV stations funded by local government unit are available through cable television only.

Commercial funding broadcasters (Cable only) 
Foreign channels neighboring countries are available in BiH. For this reason, all TV advertisements from common ex-Yugoslav area are freely broadcast on a daily basis in Bosnian cable systems. That is a major problem for domestic commercial media market, cable and satellite TV stations that aim to capture wider audiences.

Foreign pay-tv channels 

Depending on cable provider and subscription type, cable TV offer usually includes channels such as FOX, FOX Movies, FOX Life, FOX Crime, AXN, MGM, Sci Fi Channel, Eurosport, MTV, Comedy Central Extra, National Geographic Channel (with subtitles in official Bosnian, Croatian or Serbian). Bosnian cable operators offer a large number of regional national (e.g., HRT, RTS, B92) and international TV channels (e.g., CNN, DW, RTL, Euronews, Russia Today).

Premium sports offer is mostly limited to Arena Sport or Sport Klub TV packages.
Premium movies channels are mostly limited to the HBO and Cinemax TV packages.

There are seven licensed providers of on-demand services (VOD) in Bosnia and Herzegovina.

United Group / United Media

Digital television transition in BiH 
The process of digitization is still going on. Communications Regulatory Agency of BiH issued the first licences for digital broadcasting in BiH to broadcasters BHRT, RTVFBiH and RTRS.

Permits are valid from March 1, 2016.

Council of Ministers of BiH has decided to use the DVB-T2 standard for digital TV services in all nine allotments.

First stage of the transition to digital broadcasting covered Sarajevo, Mostar and Banja Luka and was completed on 14 October 2016. During this test phase, in some parts of the country, programmes from the public broadcasters (BHRT, FTV and RTRS) are broadcasting in digital form where equipment has been installed. The signal can also be received in the surrounding cities (Ilijaš, Visoko, Pale, Istočno Sarajevo, Prijedor, Gradiška, Laktaši, Čelinac and places in the Neretva river valley towards Čapljina) and places with optical visibility at the emission locations. Due to the abolition of the old analogue frequency for the purposes of digital, one commercial station temporarily emits digital signal in Banja Luka area. (K3 Prnjavor).

The second and third phase will cover six remaining areas for completing MUX-A in the whole territory of the country. That process will
be completed after tender procedure. MUX-B is intended for privately owned and regional TV stations.

Most-viewed channels in BiH 

By 2012, information from MARECO INDEX BOSNIA (TNS) was used, and after 2014, survey data from Audience Measurement (Nielsen) is used.

Annual viewership overview 
Annual viewership overview:

Defunct television channels in BiH

See also 
 List of cable television companies in BiH
 List of radio stations in Bosnia and Herzegovina

References

External links 
 Communications Regulatory Agency of Bosnia and Herzegovina
 Ministry of Communications and Transport BiH
 BHRT website
 Association of Private Electronic Media in Bosnia and Herzegovina

 
Communications in Bosnia and Herzegovina